Guangde is a county-level city in the southeast of Anhui Province, People's Republic of China, bordering the provinces of Jiangsu to the north and Zhejiang to the east. It is the easternmost county-level division of Anhui and is under the jurisdiction of the prefecture-level city Xuancheng within Anhui Province. The seat of government is at Taozhou Town.

Guangde has jurisdiction over six towns and ten townships.

Administrative divisions
Guangde City is divided to 5 towns and 4 townships.
Towns

Townships

Industry 

Climate

Transport 
 China National Highway 318; Guangde Nan Highspeed Train station.

Chinese manned space program

On July 19, 1964, China launched and recovered its first successful experimental biological rocket carrying eight white mice from the Chinese Academy of Sciences Base 603 launch site in Shijie Town within the city.

Culture
Prior to the late 19th century, most residents spoke a Jianghuai Mandarin dialect. Thereafter many people in the southern and eastern parts of the city began to speak Old Guangde dialect, a Taihu Wu Chinese dialect closely related to that of Suzhou dialect and Shanghainese. Most residents also speak the Southwestern Mandarin Guangde dialect.

See also
 Chinese space program

References

County-level divisions of Anhui
Xuancheng